Vera Orlova may refer to:
Vera Georgiyevna Orlova (1894–1977), Russian actress
Vera Markovna Orlova (1918–1993), Russian actress